Charles Asprey (1 November 1813 – 11 February 1892) was an English first-class cricketer. Asprey's batting style is unknown. He was christened at Mitcham, Surrey on 15 April 1816.

Asprey made a single first-class appearance for the Surrey Club against the Marylebone Cricket Club at Lord's in 1852. In a match which ended as a draw, Asprey batted once, scoring 2 runs before he was dismissed by James Grundy. This was his only appearance in first-class cricket.

He died at Godstone, Surrey on 11 February 1892.

References

External links
Charles Asprey at ESPNcricinfo
Charles Asprey at CricketArchive

1813 births
1892 deaths
People from Mitcham
English cricketers
Surrey Club cricketers